Droglowice  is a village in the administrative district of Gmina Pęcław, within Głogów County, Lower Silesian Voivodeship, in south-western Poland.

Notable residents
Princess Marie Adelheid of Lippe (1895-1993), a prominent Nazi and member of a royal family until the collapse of the German Empire in 1905, was born in the castle here.

References

Droglowice